Thimiru Pudichavan is a 2018 Indian Tamil-language action film written and directed by Ganeshaa. The film features Vijay Antony, Nivetha Pethuraj and Sai Dheena in the main lead roles. The film is produced by Fatima Vijay Antony under the production banner Vijay Antony Film Corporation and it began production in between February and March 2018. The film earlier scheduled to have its theatrical release on 6 November 2018 coinciding Diwali while scheduled to have its theatrical release clashing alongside Sarkar but was postponed to 16 November. First look poster of the film was released on 1 February 2018. It received mixed reviews; while Vijay's performance, concept and cinematography was praised, both the screenplay and sequences were criticised.

Plot 
Constable Murugavel, who is from Virudhunagar in Tamil Nadu, lives his life for his brother, who is a school student. He finds that his brother is having a criminal nature following various incidents, which points out his brother as the culprit, and his brother also has friends of similar nature. Murugavel tries various ways to change the mindset of his brother but fails.

One fine day, Murugavel's brother runs away from home to live a better life, which he dreams of. Murugavel, at the same time, gets posted as a sub-inspector in Chennai. While in Chennai, Murugavel discovers that his brother is now a well-known criminal who is involved in snatching as well as other criminal cases. He learns that his brother and others who do such cases are under 18 years of age, and they are controlled by a person named Meesa Padma, a local thug and gangster who uses children under 18 years of age for his antisocial activities. Murugavel is identified as a vegetable vendor by his brother, and Murugavel also shows interest to live with his brother. On the other hand, Murugavel's brother tries to kill Murugavel by adding poison to the food bought for him, but Murugavel refuses to eat for three consecutive days.

On the place where Murugavel has set his vegetable shop, he meets Madonna, a policewoman who comes to collect bribes from local shopkeepers. At night, Murugavel's brother plans the next operation of snatching at a spot near Murugavel's shop. He is revealed as a police officer to his brother that night and chases his brother through the streets. When caught, he says that he is not yet 18 years of age, so he cannot be considered legally guilty. Murugavel somehow manages to make it 12:00 AM, the day when his brother turns 18. He then kills his brother.

From there, Murugavel is regarded as a daring police officer and is promoted to Inspector but fights the condition of getting high blood pressures and insomnia at times. He sets out on a mission to solve problems in the city and decides to take on Meesa Padma by projecting the police as a heroic figure rather than Meesa Padma, who the youngsters see as their hero. In a sub-plot, love blossoms between Madonna and Murugavel. Throughout the story, Madonna is seen protecting Murugavel in several ways, while also expressing her love for him. One day, Murugavel gets slit by two young boys working for Meesa Padma. He is then saved and admitted to the hospital by Madonna, who had foreseen a nightmare of Murugavel getting slit. With the people shutting their shops to go see him, the young boys realize their mistake and side with Murugavel during the final climactic fight between Murugavel and Meesa Padma which sees, Murugavel emerging victorious and Meesa Padma fractured in several places by the youngsters. They become "Friends of Police" on the recommendation of Murugavel.

Murugavel then gets promoted to Assistant Commissioner of Police by the Inspector General, the order for which is heard on Madonna's walkie-talkie. Murugavel finally is at peace, when he sees his mother's photo on which the hallucination of his brother comes at peace with him when his brother is seen apologizing for his mistake and reveres Murugavel as the real hero and allows him to sleep in peace.

We see that Murugavel's blood pressure remains stabilized at normal during his sleep, implying that he has overcome his insomnia.

Cast 
 Vijay Antony as Inspector Murugavel
 Nivetha Pethuraj as Sub-Inspector Madonna
 Sai Dheena as Meesai Padma
 Lakshmy Ramakrishnan as Doctor
 Swaminathan as Madonna's father
 Prabhakaran as Lawyer
 Vazhakku En Muthuraman as Commissioner
 Jack Robin as Ravi (Murugavel's brother)
 Nixen as Teenager
 Kicha as Teenager
 Sampath Ram as Constable
 Balla as Meesai Padma's henchman
 Sindhuja as constable

Production 
The production of the film commenced in around February 2018 by director Ganeshaa, who earlier made his debut directorial venture through Nambiyaar in 2016, whereas Vijay Antony was coincidentally chosen as the music director for that film.

The filmmakers initially planned the idea of releasing the film in Telugu language only but later revealed that the film would have its theatrical release in Tamil as well. The film title was announced by the director casting Vijay Antony in the male lead role while Vijay Antony was awaiting for his first film in the year 2018, Kaali. The shooting of the film was commenced in Chennai, and the post production works of the movie were completed in Thirunelveli around September 2018. It's a low budget movie due to the box office failure of the film Kaali. The motion poster of the film was released on 18 July 2018.

This also marked Vijay Antony's first film as a cop, and also handling music direction and film editor just what he did on his previous film, Annadurai. Cinematography was handled by Richard M. Nathan who previously handled the cinematography for Antony's previous film Kaali. It was also revealed that Vijay Antony had also learnt silambam for the action sequences of the movie. A.M. Rahmathulla was also hired for the sound department. The official theme song promo of the film was released as a 3D animation song on 6 October 2018 in the internet. The official teaser of the film was released on 10 October 2018 and received positive reviews among the audience with containing a devotional song of Lord Muruga.

Home media 
The satellite rights of the film were sold out to Sun TV & Premiered on August 4, 2019, Digital Rights Sold to Sun NXT.

Soundtrack

The music was composed by Vijay Antony himself, and released by Divo.

Controversy 
The producers of films including Sei, Kaatrin Mozhi and Utharavu Maharaja deeply criticized and threatened for legal actions against Vijay Antony for his sudden postponement of Thimiru Pudichavan to 16 November instead of releasing it on 6 November which would significantly affect the screening shows for the above-mentioned films on the particular date. There has been a problem with the number of screens allotted to the film. There was a total of 150 screens allowed to the film, with every step of the process took ahead with proper and legal procedure. But suddenly, another film named "Thimiru pudichaven," which was set to release on Diwali 2018, was postponed to 16 November 2018. As this film was postponed the number of screens for "Sei" was reduced to 60-70 screens.

References

External links 
 

2018 films
2010s masala films
2010s Tamil-language films
Indian action films
Films scored by Vijay Antony
Films shot in Chennai
Indian police films
Films shot in Tirunelveli
Fictional portrayals of the Tamil Nadu Police
2018 action films
2010s police films